Bleptina is a genus of litter moths of the family Erebidae. It was erected by Achille Guenée in 1854.

Description
Palpi with second joint reaching far above vertex of head. Third joint long with a tuft of hair on inner side. Antennae fasciculated (bundled) in male. Thorax and abdomen smoothly scaled. Forewings with somewhat acute apex. Veins 8 and 9 anastomosing (fusing) to form the areole, which is short and broad or long and narrow. Vein 10 sometimes given off beyond it. Hindwings with vein 5 from near lower angle of cell.

Species
Bleptina acastusalis Walker, [1859] Puerto Rico
Bleptina aeatusalis Walker, 1859 Brazil (Rio de Janeiro)
Bleptina albidiscalis Warren, 1889 Brazil (Amazonas)
Bleptina antinoe Druce, 1891 Panama
Bleptina araealis (Hampson, 1901) Florida, Antilles
Bleptina athusalis Schaus, 1916 Cuba
Bleptina atymnusalis (Walker, [1859])
Bleptina baracoana Schaus, 1916 Cuba
Bleptina bogesalis Walker, 1859 Brazil (Rio de Janeiro)
Bleptina caradrinalis Guenée, 1854 southern US - Brazil, Antilles, Venezuela, Puerto Rico – bent-winged owlet moth
Bleptina carlona Schaus, 1916 Cuba
Bleptina clara Schaus, 1906 Brazil (Paraná)
Bleptina confusalis Guenée, 1854 Brazil, Venezuela
Bleptina confusaloides Poole, 1989 Venezuela
Bleptina cryptoleuca Prout, 1921 eastern Zaire
Bleptina dejecta Schaus, 1916 French Guiana
Bleptina diopis (Hampson, 1904) Bahamas
Bleptina eminens Schaus, 1916 French Guiana
Bleptina fasciata Dognin, 1914 Colombia
Bleptina flaviguttalis Barnes & McDunnough, 1912 Arizona
Bleptina frontalis Walker, 1862 southern Africa
Bleptina hydrillalis Guenée, 1854 southern US, Central America, Antilles
Bleptina infausta Schaus, 1913 Costa Rica
Bleptina inferior Grote, 1872 Florida, Alabama, Texas
Bleptina intractalis Walker, 1862 southern Africa
Bleptina lasaea Druce, 1891 Panama, Costa Rica
Bleptina latona Schaus, 1916 French Guiana
Bleptina madopalis Guenée, 1854
Bleptina malia Druce, 1891 Panama
Bleptina menalcasalis Walker, [1859] Antilles - Venezuela
Bleptina minimalis Barnes & McDunnough, 1912 Arizona
Bleptina muricolor Schaus, 1916 Cuba
Bleptina nisosalis Walker, [1859]
Bleptina niveigutta Schaus, 1916 French Guiana
Bleptina obscura Schaus, 1913 Costa Rica
Bleptina olearos Dognin, 1914 Colombia
Bleptina ophelasalis Walker, 1859 Brazil (Rio de Janeiro)
Bleptina pentheusalis Walker, [1859] Venezuela
Bleptina pithosalis Walker, [1859]
Bleptina pollesalis Walker, 1859 Brazil (Rio de Janeiro)
Bleptina pudesta Schaus, 1916 Cuba
Bleptina sangamonia Barnes & McDunnough, 1912 Illinois
Bleptina styrusalis Walker, 1859 Brazil (Rio de Janeiro)
Bleptina syrnialis Guenée, 1854 Brazil
Bleptina tenebrosa Mabille, 1900
Bleptina vultura Schaus, 1916 Venezuela

References

Herminiinae
Moth genera